

This is a list of the National Register of Historic Places listings in Prairie County, Arkansas.

This is intended to be a complete list of the properties on the National Register of Historic Places in Prairie County, Arkansas, United States.

There are 15 properties listed on the National Register in the county. Another three properties were once listed but have been removed.

Current listings

|}

Former listings

|}

See also

List of National Historic Landmarks in Arkansas
National Register of Historic Places listings in Arkansas

References

Prairie County, Arkansas
Prairie County